Umm Al Afaei is a rural district in Qatar, located in the municipality of Al Rayyan.

The districts of Umm Leghab and Lehsiniya in Al-Shahaniya Municipality are nearby to the west.

Etymology
In Arabic, "umm" translates to "mother" and is used as a prefix for geographical features. The second word, "afaei", translates to snakes. Since the area is located on a rawda (depression), it used to be infested with snakes, earning it its name.

References

Populated places in Al Rayyan